Jean-Paul Lewis (born 20 October 1993) is a South African professional rugby union player for the in the Currie Cup and in the Rugby Challenge. He usually plays as a winger and has occasionally played as an outside centre.

Rugby career

Schoolboy rugby

Lewis was born and bred in Stellenbosch. He represented  at various youth levels, from as early as primary school level when he played for them in the 2006 Under-13 Craven Week tournament. He then attended Paul Roos Gymnasium, once again earning several selections; he played at the Under-16 Grant Khomo Week in 2009 and at the Under-18 Craven Week the following year. After the 2010 Craven Week, he was also included in a South Africa Schools squad that played against their Namibian counterparts in Johannesburg. Lewis started the match and scored one of his side's 14 tries in a 92–21 victory.

Lewis was again selected to represent Western Province at the 2011 Craven Week, scoring tries against Border and the Pumas in his two matches. Another call-up to the South African Schools team followed and Lewis again contributed a try, helping South Africa to a 21–14 victory over France A in Port Elizabeth.

Western Province / Maties

After school, Lewis joined the Cape Town-based Western Province academy and was the main left winger for their Under-19 squad that participated in the 2012 Under-19 Provincial Championship, starting thirteen of their fourteen matches in the competition. After scoring a try in each of their matches against the Golden Lions, Free State and SWD, he scored a brace in their return leg against the Golden Lions and a hat-trick against the Blue Bulls. His eight tries – the second-most by a Western Province player behind Justin Geduld and fourth overall in Group A of the competition – helped Western Province finish top of the log with ten wins in twelve matches. Despite not adding to his try tally in the title play-offs, Williams helped Western Province to a semi-final victory over the Golden Lions and a 22–18 victory in the final against the Blue Bulls. The only match that he missed during the season – their Round twelve match against the Sharks – was due to him playing for the  squad in the 2012 Under-21 Provincial Championship in a defeat to the Sharks U21s.

He scored another against  a week later, and a third against Western Cape rivals . He made three starts and an appearance off the bench during a regular season that saw Maties win all seven of their matches to finish top of the log. He made ten appearances for the Western Province Under-21 team in the 2013 Under-21 Provincial Championship, scoring tries against Border, Free State and the Leopards. Western Province finished top of the log to qualify for the play-offs and Lewis came on for the final few minutes of normal time in their semi-final match against the Golden Lions. The match finished 34–all, but Western Province eventually won the match 44–41 after extra time. Lewis was an unused replacement in their 30–23 victory over the Blue Bulls a week later.

At the start of 2014, Lewis was included in 's Vodacom Cup squad. He made his first class debut on 8 March 2014, as his side beat  16–8. He played in his third Under-21 Provincial Championship in the second half of 2014, again being a key player for the team by starting eleven of their twelve matches during the regular season.

After not featuring in the competition in 2014, Lewis returned to Varsity Cup action with Maties in 2015. He started in all seven of their matches, scoring three tries – two against Western Cape rivals  and a third against  – in a disappointing season for Maties which saw them miss out on a semi-final spot for only the second time in the competition's history. Despite his side misfiring, Lewis' performances were noted and he was included in a Varsity Cup Dream Team at the conclusion of the tournament, starting the team's match against a South Africa Under-20 team that prepared for the 2015 World Rugby Under 20 Championship. Lewis rejoined the Western Province Vodacom Cup squad, but failed to score any tries in his five appearances.

Lewis had another proficient season in the 2016 Currie Cup qualification series, which replaced the Vodacom Cup competition.

Pumas

During the 2016 Currie Cup qualification series, the Nelspruit-based  announced the signing of Lewis, along with fellow Western Province player Devon Williams.

References

South African rugby union players
Living people
1993 births
People from Stellenbosch
Rugby union centres
Rugby union wings
Pumas (Currie Cup) players
Western Province (rugby union) players
Rugby union players from the Western Cape